Stop the Bans was a series of rallies held in the United States on May 21, 2019, protesting abortion bans and restrictions. Supporting organizations include the American Civil Liberties Union (ACLU), NARAL Pro-Choice America, and Planned Parenthood.

About 
Several states in 2019 enacted laws that caused abortion bans that abortion rights supporters considered extreme. At the time of the protests, these states were Alabama, Mississippi and Ohio. Missouri and Louisiana were also considering similar laws at the time. Supporters also considered laws regarding abortion in Michigan to be extreme. Protesters at the Stop the Bans rallies were concerned about women's rights being eroded. Demonstrators at the rallies felt that politicians should not be making medical decisions about women's bodies.

Locations
Demonstrations were organized in possibly all fifty U.S. states.

Northeast 

 Boston
 Philadelphia
 Providence, Rhode Island

New York saw protests in Manhattan and Mineola.

South 

 Atlanta
 Charlottesville, Virginia
 Louisville, Kentucky
 Myrtle Beach, South Carolina
 Nashville, Tennessee
 Raleigh, North Carolina
 Washington, D.C.
 Wilmington, Delaware

Florida saw demonstrations in Fort Myers and St. Petersburg.

In Maryland, there were protests in Annapolis and Towson.

In Texas, there was a rally held in El Paso at the County Courthouse.

Midwest 

 Chicago, Illinois
 Fargo, North Dakota
 St. Paul, Minnesota

Participating cities in Iowa included Cedar Rapids and Des Moines.

In Indiana, there were protests in Fort Wayne and Indianapolis.

Michigan saw demonstrations in Ann Arbor, Detroit, Ferndale, and Lansing.

In Missouri, there were demonstrations in Jefferson City and St. Louis.

Wisconsin saw protests in Appleton and Eau Claire.

West 

 Albuquerque, New Mexico
 Juneau, Alaska

California saw demonstrations in Los Angeles, San Francisco, San Jose, Oakland, Palo Alto, Fullerton, Irvine, Mission Viejo, San Clemente, San Diego, San Luis Obispo, Santa Barbara, and Sebastopol.

In Colorado, there were protests in Boulder and Fort Collins.

An event was also planned in Coeur d'Alene, Idaho.

Oregon saw demonstrations in Eugene and Portland.

In Washington state, there were demonstrations in Seattle, Spokane, and Yakima.

In Wyoming, a protest took place in Laramie.

See also

 Abortion in the United States
 Abortion in the United States by state
 United States abortion-rights movement

References

External links
 

2019 in American politics
2019 protests
Abortion in the United States
Abortion-rights movement
May 2019 events in the United States
Protests in the United States